Prisoner Number One (Danish:Fange nr. 1) is a 1935 Danish comedy film directed by Pál Fejös and starring Christian Arhoff, Robert Storm Petersen and Rasmus Christiansen.

Cast
 Christian Arhoff as Felix  
 Robert Storm Petersen as Fangevogter  
 Rasmus Christiansen as Politiinspektør Petræus  
 Maria Garland as Fru Petræus  
 Tove Wallenstrøm as Irene Petræus  
 Victor Montell as Borgmester  
 Eigil Reimers as Grev Romano  
 Aage Bendixen as Regissør 
 Christian Schrøder as Portner  
 Erik Hoffman as Baron Satagos 
 Petrine Sonne

References

Bibliography 
 Cunningham, John. Hungarian Cinema: From Coffee House to Multiplex. Wallflower Press, 2004. 
 Georges Sadoul & Peter Morris. Dictionary of Film Makers. University of California Press, 1972.

External links 
 

1935 films
Danish comedy films
1935 comedy films
1930s Danish-language films
Films directed by Paul Fejos
Danish black-and-white films